The New Blaine School is a historic school building at the junction of Arkansas Highway 22 and Spring Road in New Blaine, Arkansas.  It is a single story masonry structure, built of coursed stone and covered by a complex gable-on-hip roof with triangular dormers.  Its entrances are sheltered by Craftsman-style gabled porticos, supported by tapered square posts set on stone piers.  It was built in 1925 by a local contractor to replace an older school.

The building was listed on the National Register of Historic Places in 1992.

See also
National Register of Historic Places listings in Logan County, Arkansas

References

School buildings on the National Register of Historic Places in Arkansas
National Register of Historic Places in Logan County, Arkansas
School buildings completed in 1925
Buildings and structures in Logan County, Arkansas
1925 establishments in Arkansas